Assamese literature is the entire corpus of poetry, novels, short stories, documents and other writings in the Assamese language. It also includes popular ballads in the older forms of the language during its evolution to the contemporary form. The literary heritage of the Assamese language can be traced back to the c. 9-10th century in the Charyapada, where the earliest elements of the language can be discerned.

Poets are listed in alphabetical order by their pen name, as rendered in Latin script.

See also
 Assamese Poetry
 Assamese literature
 List of Indian poets

References

External links
 Sobriquets, at Enajori.com website.
 Pen Name/Original Name at Enajori.com website.
 Ganesh Chandra Deka Deka Ganesh Chandra - Google Scholar Citations.

Writers
Writers

Assamese